Iphidinychus is a genus of mites in the family Polyaspididae. There is at least one described species in Iphidinychus, I. gaieri.

References

Mesostigmata
Articles created by Qbugbot